A Pair of Hellions is a 1924 American silent Western film directed by Walter Willis. It was produced by Max O. Miller and written by Peter Clark MacFarlane.

Plot
A rustler (Ranger Bill Miller) flees to New York City, where he reforms himself and marries a dance hall girl (Patricia Palmer). When he returns to the west with his wife, he is almost lynched for his past crimes, but he is pardoned when he promises that he is reformed.

Cast
 Ranger Bill Miller as Luther Jones
 Margaret Gibson as Mabel Turner, a Dance Hall Girl (credited as Patricia Palmer)
 Hal Stephens
 Ashley Cooper
 Flora Mae Moore as Irish Woman

References

External links

1924 films
1924 Western (genre) films
American black-and-white films
Silent American Western (genre) films
1920s American films
1920s English-language films